1966 in Korea may refer to:
1966 in North Korea
1966 in South Korea